Gerald Maurice Ronson, CBE (born 27 May 1939) is a British business tycoon and convicted criminal. He became known in the UK as one of the 'Guinness Four' for his part in the Guinness share-trading fraud of the 1980s as a result of which he was convicted and imprisoned.

Early life and career
Ronson was born into a middle-class Jewish family. He left school aged 15 to join his father in the family furniture business, named Heron after his father Henry. The company expanded into property development, at first with small residential projects, and later with commercial and office properties. By 1967 the company was active in seven European countries and fifty-two British municipalities. In the mid-1960s Ronson brought the first self-service petrol retail outlets to the United Kingdom.

Heron International

By the early 1980s Heron was one of the largest private companies in the United Kingdom, with assets of over £1.5 billion. In 1989, Ronson was listed by The Times as having a net worth of £500 million.

Ronson said that "The Ronson family lost $1 billion of its own money in the property crash of the early 1990s....the important thing was to rebuild." By the 1990s, Heron almost collapsed, with over £1 billion owed to 11,000 bondholders. The company survived with loans from Bill Gates, Rupert Murdoch, Craig McCaw, Oracle Corporation's founder, Larry Ellison, and others, and went on to develop projects including Heron Tower and The Heron in the City of London and The Peak in London's Victoria.

Ronson's later additional business ventures included Ronson Capital Partners, an investment firm he established to invest opportunistically in real estate assets in the UK; and Rontec Investments, a consortium comprising Snax 24, Investec and Grovepoint Capital, created to acquire the assets of Total Oil UK.

Criminal conviction and the "Guinness Four"
Ronson became notorious in the UK as one of the Guinness Four for his involvement in the Guinness share-trading fraud of the 1980s. He was convicted in August 1990 of one charge of conspiracy, two of false accounting, and one of theft. He was fined £5 million and given a one-year jail sentence, of which he served six months. In 2000 the European Court of Human Rights ruled that use of statements made to inspectors in the 1990 trial had been unfair, but rejected five other complaints and denied a costs application. An appeal to the Court of Appeal Criminal Division, seeking to have the Human Rights Act 1998 applied retrospectively, failed in 2001. A final appeal to the House of Lords failed in 2002. No further appeal was possible and the convictions were upheld.

Philanthropy
Gerald Ronson is a long-time supporter of Jewish and other charitable causes. He is the Founding Chairman of the Jewish Community Security Trust, Vice-president of the NSPCC and President of JCoSS.

Ronson won City AM's Personality of the Year Award in September 2011 and other awards. In 2009, Juan Carlos I of Spain bestowed the Encomienda de Numero of the Spanish Order of Civil Merit Decoration on Ronson. In the same year, he was awarded an Honorary Doctorate of Civil Law by Northumbria University.

Ronson was appointed Commander of the Order of the British Empire (CBE) in the 2012 New Year Honours list for charitable services, notwithstanding his convictions, fines and imprisonment.

Personal life
Ronson is married to philanthropist and socialite Dame Gail Ronson. They have four daughters: Lisa, Amanda, Nicole and Hayley. He is the uncle of record producer Mark Ronson.

When asked about his family and Jewish heritage in an interview with the Jewish Telegraph, Ronson responded: "I am a proud Jew [...] when I go back to when I was a young boy, nothing has changed and that's how I look at the Ronson family, involved in school building, whether it be Israel, the Jewish Leadership Council, Jewish Care or most of the major organisations I've been involved in". He wants his four daughters, nine grandchildren and eventual great-grandchildren to "understand who they are, what they are, what their background is and what their responsibility is. I've given them the tools to be able to continue doing those things in their life which I believe will make them good people".

References

External links
 New Years Honours List 2012, BBC News, 31 December 2011.
 "Guinness Four fail in fight for acquittal", BBC News, 21 December 2001.
 "Life and high-flying times of four partners in crime", The Scotsman, 22 December 2001.
 Gerald Ronson profile in the UK business magazine Leisure Management
 [http://www.building.co.uk/comment/a-guy-called-gerald/3081333.article "A Guy Named Gerald," interview with Gerald Ronson, Building.co.uk], 2007.

1939 births
Living people
People from Paddington
British Ashkenazi Jews
English Jews
Businesspeople from London
20th-century British businesspeople
21st-century British businesspeople
English philanthropists
Jewish British philanthropists
Commanders of the Order of the British Empire
Gerald Ronson